Billingborough is a village and civil parish in the South Kesteven district of Lincolnshire, England.

History
The village is named after the post-Roman Billings tribe of invaders. The village was formerly served by the Billingborough and Horbling railway station on the Bourne and Sleaford Railway, giving the village connections to nearby Bourne and Sleaford. The former high school name, Aveland, is taken from a pre-conquest wapentake of that name, dating to 921. The wapentake extended from Bourne to Threekingham. The area was populous in the Middle Ages, and included the lost village of Ouseby  as well as the shrunken village of Birthorpe. St Andrew's Church dates to the 13th century and is in a mixture of Perpendicular Gothic and Decorated styles.

One Saturday in 1791 a match at foot-ball was played in Osbournby field between the bachelors of Osbournby and Billingboroough; when, after a severe contest of six hours, wherein several feats of agility were shewn, it was decided in favour of the youths of Billingborough; on which occasion they wore favours of blue ribband, as a mark of their distinction.

Community
Billingborough is positioned at the edge of The Fens. According to the 2001 census, it had a population of 1,098 in 461 households. By 2011 both figures had risen, to 1,401.

The village has a single primary school. There formerly existed a secondary modern school, The Aveland High School, which opened in 1963 but closed in January 2010 to merge with a Sleaford school to form St George's Academy. The high school was later demolished and the site redeveloped for housing.

The parish church is dedicated to St Andrew. Under the Diocese of Lincoln, the ecclesiastical parish is part of The Billingborough Group in the Lafford Deanery. As of 2014, the priest-in-charge is Rev Anna Sorensen.

Billingborough has a small number of shops on High Street as well as a public house called the "Fortescue Arms". There is also an Army Cadet Force detachment next to the St George's Academy site. It is part of the Lincolnshire Army Cadet Force and wears the cap badge of the Royal Engineers. The village Billingborough Horbling and Threekingham Cricket Club gained entry into the ECB Lincs Premier League in 2013.

Notable people
Richard Nauyokas, of Lads Army lived in the village
Eric Houghton, Aston Villa and England footballer and Villa manager, was born in the village.
Robert Gordon Latham, ethnologist and philologist was born in Billingborough in 1812

References

External links

 Portrait of the village
 Photographs of the village
 Cricket Club

Villages in Lincolnshire
Civil parishes in Lincolnshire
South Kesteven District